British Northrop Loom Co Ltd was an engineering firm based in Blackburn, Lancashire, England. The company manufactured machinery for producing textiles, particularly the Northrop Loom.

The firm was founded in 1902. It expanded rapidly around the time of the First World War, and by the 1950s it exported over 10,000 machines annually worldwide.

References

Manufacturing companies established in 1902
Companies based in Lancashire